"Players" is a song by American rapper and singer Coi Leray. It was released as a single through Uptown Records on November 30, 2022. Leray wrote the song with producer Johnny Goldstein, alongside WorldWideFresh and Feli Ferraro. It contains samples of American hip hop group Grandmaster Flash and the Furious Five's 1982 single, "The Message", from their debut studio album The Message.

Background
In early November 2022, Leray teased a snippet of the song on the video-sharing app TikTok and described it as a song that was dedicated to women being "players". The song samples "The Message" by Grandmaster Flash and the Furious Five, in which she raps: "What you know about living on top / Penthouse suites looking down on the opps / Took him for a test drive / Left him on the lot / Time is money / So I spent it on a watch". About one week later, Leray met up with Grandmaster Flash from the hip hop group for dinner, in which he gifted her a custom-made hoodie with the phrase "Girls Are Players Too" on it to support the release of the song. In late December 2022, she revealed that she freestyle rapped the song in one take.

Credits and personnel
 Coi Leray – vocals, songwriting
 Johnny Goldstein – production, songwriting
 Akil King – songwriting
 Feli Ferraro – songwriting
 Patrizio "Teezio" Pigliapoco – mixing
 Ignacio Portales – mixing assistance
 Joe LaPorta – mastering
 German (AyoRoc) Valdes – recording

Charts

See also 
 African-American Vernacular English (used in lyrics "girls is players too" instead of "girls are")

References

2022 singles
2022 songs
Coi Leray songs
Songs written by Coi Leray